Mandrin may refer to:
Mandrin (medical equipment), a metal guide for flexible catheters
Mandrin (1924 film), a silent French film directed by Henri Fescourt
Mandrin (1947 film), a film starring Armand Bernard
 The Adventures of Mandrin, a 1952 film starring Raf Vallone
Mandrin (1962 film), a film set in Pérouges
Mandrin (TV series), a 1972 television series

People with the name
 Louis Mandrin (1725–1755), French brigand

See also
 Mandarin (disambiguation)